Falkland is an unincorporated community located in the Columbia-Shuswap Regional District of British Columbia, Canada between Vernon and Kamloops.

The Falkland area has a wide array of lakes, often used for fishing and recreation. The Falkland Stampede begins on the Victoria Day holiday each year. This stampede is one of Canada's oldest.

Town history 

The members of the Salish tribes frequently stayed in the region during the summer to gather the tribe's food for the winter. It was the women's job to prepare the fish and meat for drying beside the fire. Where to put the meat caused slight disagreement among the women because the ever-changing breeze would cause the wind to blow in changing directions. As a result, the valley was named Slahaltkan, meaning "meeting of the winds."

The name Slahaltkan was never used among those who eventually settled in the area, although the sub-post office bore the name. When the settlement developed, it required a postal address. The government asked if Colonel Falkland G.E. Warren, R.H.A.; C.M.G.; C.B. (an early European pioneer in the valley) would object to his name being used. The postal records from 1894 indicated that the proposals for the new post office in the area would either be "Falkland" or "Salmon River."

Rodeo
The Falkland Stampede was first held on March 24, 1919, in the gyp field in the northwest corner of the townsite. The early years of the rodeo introduced numerous changes to the grounds, including a fence to protect the spectators and a small corral to hold the horses. The first site chosen for more permanent facilities was, at the time, the old mill site. Early events included chuckwagon racing, bull riding, bucking horse riding, and many small games intended for children and women.

Falkland's Canadian flag 
The purpose of Falkland's Canadian flag was to support the I Care Campaign, which received international attention after the people of Falkland challenged the rest of Canada to fly the Canadian flag. The flag's structure includes eight  telephone poles,  cement blocks, and 3,500 screws. The flag's colours are heated onto enamel. 

It is illuminated at night, allowing visitors of Falkland to view the flag at any time. The power reaches the flag from a  extension cord. A total of 19 corporate sponsors donated material, equipment and labour for the flag's construction. The total cost of the flag was $42,493, including $33,960 for construction, $3,343 for lighting, and $5,190 for lettering.

Location 
Falkland is nestled in the confluence of three valleys and two rivers, the Salmon River and the Bolean Creek. It is cradled by Tuktakamin Mountain to the south, and Estekawalan Mountain to the west.

References 

https://www.abebooks.com/first-edition/Meeting-Winds-History-Falkland-British-Columbia/12794337388/bd

External links 
Falkland, British Columbia at BritishColumbia.com

BritishColumbia.com Falkland

Populated places in the Columbia-Shuswap Regional District
Shuswap Country
Unincorporated settlements in British Columbia
Designated places in British Columbia